The English Football Hall of Fame is housed at the National Football Museum in Manchester, England. The Hall aims to celebrate and highlight the achievements of the all-time top English footballing talents, as well as non-English players and managers who have become significant figures in the history of the English game. New members are added each year, with an induction ceremony held in the autumn, formerly at varying locations, but exclusively at the Museum itself following its move to Manchester's Urbis building in 2012.

The Hall is on permanent display at the Museum. An accompanying book, The Football Hall of Fame: The Official Guide to the Greatest Footballing Legends of All Time, was first published in October 2005 by Robson Books. Authored by football historian Rob Galvin and the Museum's founding curator Mark Bushell, it is updated every year with the newest inductees, containing an in-depth profile about the career and reputation of each one, along with a select exhibit from the Museum which relates to their achievements.

Selection panel
Members of the Hall of Fame are chosen by a panel. Initially, this consisted of ex-players Jimmy Armfield, Sir Trevor Brooking, Jimmy Hill, Mark Lawrenson and Gordon Taylor, all of whom had become professional pundits and/or senior figures in football after retiring.

In subsequent years, former England national team manager Graham Taylor and former England international Steve Hodge have also served stints on the panel, though it is now chiefly a grouping of eminent football historians. The current panel features Neil Carter, Tony Collins, Jeffrey Hill, Peter Holme, Dick Holt, John Hughson, Simon Inglis, Alexander Jackson, Gary James, Graham Kelly, Tony Mason, Kevin Moore, Martin Polley, Dil Porter, Dave Russell, Matthew Taylor, Jean Williams and John Williams.

All surviving inductees to the Hall are granted an additional place on the panel. Two players have been inducted as the 'Fans' Choice', following polls on the BBC Sport and Sky Sports websites.

History
Initially, there were three main categories of induction; a mass of 'Players' and 'Managers' from the men's game, together with one figure from the women's game (Sir Alf Ramsey is noted as the only figure to date honoured in both of the main male categories). To be considered for induction, players must be either retired or at least 30 years of age. All inductees must also have played/managed for at least five years in England.

In 2007, two other regular categories were established. Chiefly, this was in recognition of football's central role in English culture, extending Hall of Fame honours to those who have contributed greatly to the English game outside the more obvious fields of play. The Community Champion category – sponsored by the Football Foundation – honours professional players who have donated their spare time and money to the grassroots level of the sport, while the Football for All Award – sponsored by The Football Association – is presented to pioneers of the various forms of football played by disabled people.

Since 2009, the Museum has also commemorated great teams from history alongside its awarding of individual players and coaches. The criteria for a team's induction is that they must have played at least a quarter of a century prior. 2013 saw the first induction of a referee (Jack Taylor), while 2017 saw the first induction of a figure from the football media.

On occasional circumstances there will also be a presentation of a 'special award', usually to mark significant anniversaries. Jimmy Hill is to date the sole recipient of an honour styled as a Lifetime Achievement Award, in celebration of his unusual polymathic career in the game.

On 27 February 2020 the Premier League announced plans to officially launch its Hall of Fame, with plans to induct its first two players on 19 March 2020.  For one to be inducted in the Premier League Hall of Fame, it is a requirement that the player must be a retiree of the Premier League and only the player's Premier League career will be used for consideration for their candidacy.

Inductees

Men

Women

Managers

Other awards
In 2004, Sepp Blatter, then president of FIFA, was inducted to mark the world federation's centenary. He became the first figure outside the English game to be honoured by the Museum.

In 2007, the Football Foundation Community Champion award was created, with its inaugural holder being Niall Quinn. The following winners were Peter Beardsley (2008), Robbie Earle (2009) and Graham Taylor (2010). The award has been inactive since then.

Also in 2007, the Football for All Award was created, with its inaugural holder being Stephen Daley, a Northern Irish-born English footballer whose professional career was ended by loss of vision at 18, and later became the captain of the partially sighted England national team. In 2008, Steve Johnson, a regular member of the England squad for amputee football and the leader of Everton's charity venture, Everton in the Community, won the award. In 2009, Ronnie Watson, a footballer who has learning disabilities, won the award. He had been training with Oldham Athletic, in preparation for the 2008 European Learning Disability Championship, where he would captain the England LD side. In 2010, George Ferguson won the award. Ferguson is a long-time member of Everton's blind football team and secretary of the Visually Impaired Football League. 2013 saw David Clarke, captain of Great Britain blind football team, win the award. From 2014 to 2017, members of the England cerebral palsy team were honoured, with Matt Dimbylow, Gary Davies, Martin Sinclair and Alistair Patrick-Heselton winning.

The presentation of a special award would happen sporadically over the years. In 2007, Sheffield, the world's oldest football club was commemorated for reaching its 150th anniversary. In 2008, Michel Platini, then president of UEFA, became the second figure outside the English game to be honoured by the Museum in a one-off European Hall of Fame ceremony. Two years later, Jimmy Hill was honoured with a special lifetime achievement award. In 2013, the special award was used three times. Firstly, to Civil Service, the only surviving club of those represented at the official formation of the Football Association in 1863. Secondly, to Ebenezer Cobb Morley, the first secretary of the Football Association and often considered to be its founding father, inducted to mark the governing body's 150th anniversary. Thirdly, to William McGregor, the founder of the Football League was inducted to commemorate the organisation's 125th anniversary. In 2014, the Football Battalion, a group of professional footballers and fans who fought in the Battle of the Somme, were honoured. In 2015, Sun Jihai, the first Chinese player in the English game, was made "Anglo-Chinese Football Ambassador". His surprise induction was announced as part of the state visit to the United Kingdom by Chinese President Xi Jinping. The decision caused controversy on social media with Labour's shadow minister for sport Clive Efford suggesting that the award had been bought by the office of Prime Minister David Cameron. A spokesman for the museum explained that Sun had been recognised for his "ambassadorial role in enhancing the profile and popularity of English football to a Chinese audience". In 2016, two clubs were honoured: Cambridge University, for their unofficial claim to be the world's oldest club; some documents in their archive suggest a foundation year of 1856, the year before Sheffield began, and Notts County for their status as the world's oldest club currently playing at a professional level; founded in 1862.

Team awards were introduced in 2008, as part of a one-off European Hall of Fame ceremony. Manchester United and Liverpool's European Cup winning sides of 1968 and 1978 were the first teams inducted. In 2009, Manchester United's Busby Babes squad of the 1950s and Manchester City's cup-winning squad of the late 1960s and early 1970s were inducted. In 2010, the World Cup winning England squad was inducted. In 2011, Aston Villa's European Cup winning side of 1982 was inducted in a special ceremony. In 2014, Preston North End's "Invincibles" team was inducted. In 2016, Nottingham Forest's European Cup winning squad of 1979 and 1980 was inducted.

In 2013, a referee section was created, with Jack Taylor being its only inductee so far, and in 2017, a journalism section was created with Hugh McIlvanney the inaugural holder.

Notes

References

External links
The National Football Museum – Hall of Fame official website

H
Hall
Football hall of fame
Association football museums and halls of fame
Museums in Manchester
Lists of English sportspeople
Halls of fame in England
2002 establishments in England
2002 in British sport
2002 in association football